Zhang Wenxiu (born 22 March 1986 in Dalian, Liaoning) is a retired Chinese female hammer thrower.

Career
She won the 2005 Asian Championships and 2006 Asian Games. She finished tenth at the 2001 World Championships, seventh at the 2004 Olympics, fifth at the 2005 World Championships and fourth at the 2006 World Cup. She then won bronze medals at the 2007 World Championships and the 2008 Olympic Games.

She also holds the world junior record with 73.24 metres, achieved in June 2005 in Changsha.

At 2014 Asian Games in Incheon, she originally won the gold medal but was stripped of it after testing positive for the prohibited substance zeranol. Zhang was reinstated after successfully appealing the decision to the Court of Arbitration for Sport (CAS), which accepted her explanation that the zeranol came from contaminated food.

Achievements

See also
China at the World Championships in Athletics

References

External links
 

1986 births
Living people
Athletes from Dalian
Chinese female hammer throwers
Olympic athletes of China
Olympic bronze medalists for China
Olympic silver medalists in athletics (track and field)
Olympic bronze medalists in athletics (track and field)
Athletes (track and field) at the 2004 Summer Olympics
Athletes (track and field) at the 2008 Summer Olympics
Medalists at the 2008 Summer Olympics
Athletes (track and field) at the 2012 Summer Olympics
Athletes (track and field) at the 2016 Summer Olympics
2016 Olympic silver medalists for China
Asian Games gold medalists for China
Asian Games medalists in athletics (track and field)
Athletes (track and field) at the 2006 Asian Games
Athletes (track and field) at the 2010 Asian Games
Athletes (track and field) at the 2014 Asian Games
World Athletics Championships medalists
Doping cases in athletics
Chinese sportspeople in doping cases
World Athletics Championships athletes for China
Medalists at the 2006 Asian Games
Medalists at the 2010 Asian Games
Medalists at the 2014 Asian Games
Olympic silver medalists for China
21st-century Chinese women